The cocha antshrike (Thamnophilus praecox) is a species of bird in the family Thamnophilidae. It is endemic to Ecuador.

Its natural habitat is subtropical or tropical swamps. It is threatened by habitat loss.

References

cocha antshrike
Birds of the Ecuadorian Amazon
Endemic birds of Ecuador
cocha antshrike
cocha antshrike
Taxonomy articles created by Polbot